The 1934 Nanga Parbat climbing disaster resulted in the loss of 10 lives on Nanga Parbat, the world's ninth-highest mountain and one of the 14 eight-thousanders. The disaster, which happened during the 1934 climbing season, included nine climbers who died in what was, at the time, the single deadliest mountaineering accident in history.

Event
In 1934, German climber Willy Merkl led a well financed expedition to Nanga Parbat (located in Jammu and Kashmir, British India; present-day Gilgit-Baltistan, northeastern Pakistan), with the full backing of the new Nazi government. Early in the expedition Alfred Drexel died, probably of high altitude pulmonary edema. The Tyrolean climbers  and  reached an estimated height of (7,895 m / 25,900 ft) on July 6, but were forced to return because of worsening weather. On July 7, they and 14 others were trapped by a ferocious storm at 7,480 m (24,540 ft). During the desperate retreat that followed, three famous German mountaineers,  and Merkl himself, as well as six Sherpas, died of exhaustion, exposure and altitude sickness, and several more suffered severe frostbite. The last survivor to reach safety, Ang Tsering, did so having spent seven days battling through the storm. It has been said that the disaster, "for sheer protracted agony, has no parallel in climbing annals."

Books
Jonathan Neale wrote a book about the 1934 climbing season on Nanga Parbat called Tigers of the Snow. He interviewed many old Sherpas, including Ang Tsering, the last man off Nanga Parbat alive in 1934. The book attempts to narrate what went wrong on the expedition, set against mountaineering history of the early twentieth century, the background of German politics in the 1930s, and the hardship and passion of life in the Sherpa valleys.

See also
 List of deaths on eight-thousanders

References
 
 

Notes

Further reading
 

Mountaineering disasters
Nanga Parbat
Mountaineering in Pakistan
1934 disasters in Asia
Karakoram
1934 in British India
Disasters in Gilgit-Baltistan